Eucosma abacana is a species of moth of the family Tortricidae. It is found in China (Hebei, Inner Mongolia, Jilin, Heilongjiang, Gansu, Qinghai, Ningxia), Mongolia, Japan, Russia and Kazakhstan.

The wingspan is 15–18 mm.

The larvae feed on Artemisia species.

References

Moths described in 1877
Eucosmini